Ahmedabad Diocese is a diocese of the Malankara Orthodox Syrian Church also known as the Indian Orthodox Church located at Ahmedabad, Gujarat.

History
The diocese of Ahmedabad came into existence in 2009. The diocese was administered by the Catholicose and assisted by H.G. Geevarghese Mar Coorilos, Metropolitan of the Mumbai Diocese. The Diocese of Ahmedabad was formally inaugurated on 3 October 2009 by H.G. Dr. Mathews Mar Severios Metropolitan, Secretary to the Holy Episcopal Synod.

H.G. Dr. Geevarghese Mar Yulios took charge of the Diocesan Metropolitan on 15 August 2010.

Diocesan Metropolitan

List Of Parishes
The area covered by the diocese include the state of  Gujarat, Rajasthan, Madhya Pradesh and 4 parishes from Sultanate of Oman.

Madhya Pradesh, Gujarat and Rajasthan

Madhya Pradesh
 St. Mary's Orthodox Congregation, Punasa, Madhaya Pradesh
 St. George Orthodox Church, Nagda, Dewas, Madhya Pradesh
 St. Gregorios Orthodox Church, Khandwa, Madhya Pradesh
 St. Gregorios Orthodox Church, Ujjain, Madhya Pradesh
 St. Mary's Orthodox Church, Indore, Madhya Pradesh
 St. Mary's Orthodox Church, Dewas, Madhya Pradesh
 St. Gregorios Orthodox Church, Mhow, Pithampur, Madhya Pradesh

Rajasthan
 St. George Orthodox Church, Chittorgarh, Rajasthan
 St. Gregorious Orthodox Church, Dungarpur, Rajasthan
 St. Gregorios Orthodox Church, Udaipur, Rajasthan
 St. Mary's Orthodox Church, Bhilwara, Rajasthan
 St. Stephen's Orthodox Congregation, Gangapur, Rajasthan
 St. Mary's Orthodox Church, Kota, Rajasthan
 St. Stephen's Orthodox Church, Pratapgarh, Rajasthan
 St. Thomas Orthodox Church, Abu Road, Rajasthan
 St. Thomas Orthodox Church, Banswara, Rajasthan

Gujarat
 Anand St.Thomas Orthodox Church
 Ahmedabad St.Marys Orthodox Cathedral
 Bharuch St.George Orthodox Church
 Baroda Mar Gregorios Orthodox Valiyapali
 Bhavanagar St.Thomas Orthodox Church
 Ghandhidham St.Stephens Orthodox Church
 Ghandhidham Mar Gregorios Orthodox Church
 Halol St.Thomas Orthodox Church
 Jamnagar Mar Gregorios Orthodox Church
 Kalol St.George Orthodox Church
 Mehasana Mar Gregorios
 Nadiad St.peters and St.pauls Orthodox Church
 Porbandar St.Gregorios Orthodox Church
 Rajkot St.Thomas Orthodox Church
 Veraval St.Marys Orthodox Church

Sultanate Of Oman
 Mar Gregorios Orthodox Maha Edavaka, Muscat, Sultanate of Oman
 St. George Orthodox Church, Sohar, Sultanate of Oman
 St. Stephen's Orthodox Church, Salalah, Sultanate of Oman
 St. Mary's Orthodox Church, Ghala, Muscat, Sultanate of Oman

Notes

External links
 Website of Ahmedabad Diocese 
 Website of the Malankara Orthodox Syrian Church

Malankara Orthodox Syrian Church dioceses
2009 establishments in Kerala